The Gulf Coast League Cubs, or GCL Cubs, were a minor league baseball team that played in the Gulf Coast League from 1972 to 1982 and again from 1993 to 1996.  The team was affiliated with the Chicago Cubs and won GCL titles in 1972 and 1974.

See also
Gulf Coast Cubs players
Arizona League Cubs

Defunct Florida Complex League teams
Baseball in Fort Myers, Florida
Sports in Bradenton, Florida
Sports in Sarasota, Florida
Port St. Lucie, Florida
Defunct baseball teams in Florida
Baseball teams disestablished in 1996
Baseball teams established in 1972